The men's ice hockey tournament at the 1992 Winter Olympics in Albertville, France, was the 17th Olympic Championship. The games were played at the Méribel Ice Palace in Méribel, about 45 km from host city Albertville. The competition, held from 8 to 23 February, was won by the Unified Team in its only appearance. The team was composed of some newly emerged nations from the former Soviet Union, which had dissolved just weeks before the Games began. Canada won the silver medal, its first hockey medal since 1968 and 11th Olympic ice hockey medal.

Medalists

Qualification
The Olympic tournament was to be contested by twelve nations.  The top eleven nations from the 1991 World Championships (eight from pool A, top three from pool B) qualified directly, while the twelfth ranked nation had to play off against the winner of that year's pool C.

Poland qualified in final tournament

First round

Twelve participating teams were placed in two groups. After playing a round-robin, the top four teams in each group advanced to the Medal Round while the last two teams competed in the consolation round for the 9th to 12th places.

Group A

Group B

Consolation round

Bracket

9–12th-place semifinals

11th-place game

9th-place game

Final round

Bracket

Quarter-finals

5–8th-place semifinals

Semi-finals

Seventh-place game

Fifth-place game

Bronze-medal game

Gold-medal game

Statistics

Average age
Team Germany was the oldest team in the tournament, averaging 28 years and 6 months. Team USA was the youngest team in the tournament, averaging 24 years. Gold medalists Unified Team averaged 24 years and 2 months. Tournament average was 26 years and 4 months.

Leading scorers

Final rankings

Unified Medal controversy
Russian goaltender Nikolai Khabibulin was the third on the depth chart and never played when the Unified Team won gold in Albertville, France. Instead of giving the gold to someone who did not play, coach Viktor Tikhonov kept it. Only players are given Olympic medals; coaches and management are not. The medal was returned to Khabibulin in a private medal ceremony during the 2002 Winter Olympics in Salt Lake City, Utah.

References

External links
Jeux Olympiques 1992

 
1992 Winter Olympics events
1992
Olympics
1992